Chee Hong Tat (born 1973) is a Singaporean politician who has been serving as Senior Minister of State for Finance since 2022 and Senior Minister of State for Transport since 2020. A member of the governing People's Action Party (PAP), he has been the Member of Parliament (MP) representing the Toa Payoh West–Thomson division of Bishan–Toa Payoh GRC since 2015.

Before entering politics, Chee had worked at various Ministries and was Principal Private Secretary to Lee Kuan Yew from 2008 to 2011. He was also the Chief Executive Officer of the Energy Market Authority between 2011 and 2015 before he resigned to run for election in the 2015 general election as part of a five-member PAP team contesting in Bishan–Toa Payoh GRC. After the PAP team won with 73.59% of the vote, Chee became a Member of Parliament representing the Toa Payoh West–Balestier ward of Bishan–Toa Payoh GRC. Since then, he had retained his parliamentary seat in the 2020 general election and had been Minister of State and later Senior Minister of State at various Ministries.

Education
Chee was educated at The Chinese High School and Raffles Junior College before graduating from the University of California, Berkeley in 1996 with a Bachelor of Science with highest honours degree in electrical engineering and computer science, as well as a Bachelor of Arts with highest honours degree in economics, under the Overseas Merit Scholarship awarded by the Singapore Government. 

He subsequently went on to complete a Master of Business Administration degree at the University of Adelaide in 2006, and was awarded the Newmont Australia Prize for being the Most Outstanding MBA Graduate.

Public service career 
Chee joined the Singapore Administrative Service in 1998 and worked at various Ministries, including Home Affairs, Finance, Transport and Education.
	
Chee was also Principal Private Secretary to Minister Mentor Lee Kuan Yew from 2008 to 2011. During this time, he attracted attention after he wrote on behalf of Lee to The Straits Times forum on 7 March 2009 in response to a call by Nanyang Technological University's Division of Linguistics and Multilingual Studies for a return to the use of Chinese dialects. In the letter, he wrote that "it would be stupid for any Singapore agency or NTU to advocate the learning of dialects, which must be at the expense of English and Mandarin". Lee later mentioned Chee's letter in his book My Lifelong Challenge: Singapore's Bilingual Journey and said that the call to return to the use of Chinese dialects was a "daft call". During Lee's state funeral in 2015, Chee was one of the eight pallbearers.

From 9 May 2011 to 1 April 2015, Chee served as the Chief Executive Officer of the Energy Market Authority. He also was Second Permanent Secretary at the Ministry of Trade and Industry from 1 December 2014 to 11 August 2015.

Political career 
Chee resigned from the Singapore Administrative Service on 11 August 2015 to run for election in the 2015 general election as part of a five-member People's Action Party (PAP) team contesting in Bishan–Toa Payoh GRC after Wong Kan Seng, Hri Kumar and
Zainudin Nordin stepped down from their respective wards and politics.  Two years before that, he had been attending grassroots events in Bishan–Toa Payoh and Marine Parade GRCs. On 1 September 2015 (Nomination Day), Chee's fist-clenching and chest-thumping action in response to hecklers shocked a few observers and amused others. When he was asked about that, Chee replied, "I'm new to this, so there's much for me to learn. I'll certainly try to improve." On Polling Day, the PAP team won with 73.59% of the vote against the Singapore People's Party. Chee was elected Member of Parliament representing the Toa Payoh West–Balestier ward of  Bishan–Toa Payoh GRC.

On 1 October 2015, Chee was appointed Minister of State at the Ministries of Health and Communications and Information.

Chee was promoted to Senior Minister of State on 1 May 2017 and served at the Ministries of Communications and Information and Health from May 2017 to April 2018. On 9 November 2017, he alleged in a Facebook post that Leon Perera, a Non-constituency Member of Parliament, had made false accusations about Mediacorp making partisan edits on the video of a parliamentary debate on Presidential Elections (Amendment) Bill in February 2017. In response, Perera refuted Chee's allegation and stated that his questions were about the ownership of the copyright to parliamentary video footage and why parliamentary video live feed cannot be made publicly available, as is the case in many other countries. Perera later apologised in Parliament.

On 10 March 2018, Chee was one of the PAP Members of Parliament who responded to Workers' Party Member of Parliament Sylvia Lim over her remark that the government had intended to raise the goods and services tax in the current term but backtracked due to negative public reaction. He chided the Workers' Party for using this issue to discredit the PAP government, saying that it was an attack on its integrity and not responding as strongly as they did would imply that the government is dishonest. Lim acknowledged that she "may have been wrong".

On 24 April 2018, Chee was redesignated as Senior Minister of State at the Ministries of Trade and Industry and Education.

In the 2020 general election, Chee contested in Bishan–Toa Payoh GRC as part of a four-member PAP team and they won with 67.26% of the vote against the Singapore People's Party. He thus retained his parliamentary seat, representing the Toa Payoh West–Thomson ward of Bishan–Toa Payoh GRC. He is also a member of the Bishan–Toa Payoh Town Council and an advisor to the Bishan–Toa Payoh grassroots organisations. On 27 July 2020, he was appointed Senior Minister of State at the Ministries of Transport and Foreign Affairs. Following a Cabinet reshuffle, on 15 May 2021, his portfolio as Senior Minister of State for Foreign Affairs was dropped, but he remained Senior Minister of State for Transport as he was shifted to the Labour Movement following a request by PM Lee to send him in return for Koh Poh Koon. Chee was however appointed Senior Minister of State at the Ministry of Finance on 13 June 2022, he was replaced by Desmond Tan (politician) at NTUC.

Personal life 
Chee is married with four children.

References

External links
 Chee Hong Tat on Parliament of Singapore

People's Action Party politicians
Living people
1973 births
UC Berkeley College of Engineering alumni
Singaporean people of Hokkien descent
Hwa Chong Institution alumni
Raffles Junior College alumni
Members of the Parliament of Singapore